The Ratu Plaza (also known as e-Mall or e-Mall Ratu Plaza) is a shopping mall located in Gelora, Tanah Abang, Central Jakarta, Indonesia. It consists of five floors, four of which have over 6,000 m² of retail space.

The mall mainly caters to information technology customers in South Jakarta and gained reputation among expatriates and Indonesians alike for being a hotbed for bootlegged DVDs. In the 80s the mall was the host to the first Nike showroom for Indonesian market. Other big names such as Kicker's, and Levi's also had outlets in Ratu Plaza.

The mall's Carrefour supermarket (since replaced with Lotte Mart) suffered several gas poisoning incidents in 2007 and 2008, to the point that Jakarta's governor at the time Fauzi Bowo mulled a shutdown of the supermarket.

See also
 List of malls in Jakarta
 List of shopping malls in Indonesia

References

Shopping malls in Jakarta
Central Jakarta